Brigadier John Harold Hogshaw   (1896–1968) was a 
British Army officer who briefly commanded the 4th Division during the Second World War.

Military career
Hogshaw was commissioned into the Northumberland Fusiliers (later the Royal Northumberland Fusiliers) on 15 December 1914. He was awarded the Military Cross for his actions in the First World War. 

Hogshaw also served in the Second World War: he became commander of the 10th Infantry Brigade in North Africa in June 1942 and briefly took over command of the 4th Division in North Africa on 22 August 1943 and remained in command until relieved on 4 September 1943. After returning to the 10th Brigade, he went on to command the 203rd Infantry Brigade in August 1944 and the 134th Infantry Brigade in September 1944. After the war he served as Commandant of the British sector in Vienna from December 1946 to November 1949.

Hogshaw was appointed a Companion of the Order of the Bath in the 1948 Birthday Honours.

References

External links
Generals of World War II

1896 births
1968 deaths
Companions of the Order of the Bath
Recipients of the Military Cross
Royal Northumberland Fusiliers officers
British Army personnel of World War I
British Army brigadiers of World War II